Ivy Day was formerly observed on October 6 in Ireland, in memory of the prominent nationalist politician Charles Stewart Parnell who died on that date (June 27, 1846 – October 6, 1891). James Joyce's short story "Ivy Day in the Committee Room" features several Irish canvassers discussing Parnell's memory. 

A small ceremony still takes place at Parnell's graveside in Glasnevin Cemetery on the Sunday nearest 6 October. It is attended by a small number of devotees of Parnell and a brief oration is delivered in his honour (at midday).

References

Irish culture